Astiella is a genus of flowering plants in the family Rubiaceae. It was described by Jovet (1941) as a monospecific, herbaceous genus, endemic to Madagascar. Later, 11 new species endemic to Madagascar were added to the genus.

Species

Astiella antongilensis 
Astiella antsalovansis 
Astiella confusa 
Astiella deblockiae 
Astiella delicatula 
Astiella desseinii 
Astiella homolleae 
Astiella latifolia 
Astiella longifimbria 
Astiella perrieri 
Astiella pulla 
Astiella tsaratanensis

References

External links
Herbarium specimen of Astiella delicatula

Rubiaceae genera
Spermacoceae
Endemic flora of Madagascar